Lyon Charter Township is a charter township of Oakland County in the U.S. state of Michigan. The population was 14,545 at the 2010 census.

Communities 
The city of South Lyon is located on the west side of the township.

Within the township proper there are two unincorporated communities:
In 1830, Russell Alvord and Daniel Richards, from the state of New York, obtained  of land with the deed signed by U.S. President Andrew Jackson. In 1831, they opened an inn called the "Old Tavern" (still in existence as the New Hudson Inn). This served as a changing point on the stage coach line known as the New Hudson Station. A stage line post office was established in 1834. A U.S. government post office was established in June 1852. The community was platted by Russell Alvord in 1837. 
Kensington, a former village that is now Kensington Metropark.

Geography

Demographics
As of the census of 2000, there were 11,041 people, 3,887 households, and 3,055 families residing in the township. The racial makeup of the township was 97.10% White, 0.35% African American, 0.41% Native American, 0.61% Asian, 0.04% Pacific Islander, 0.45% from other races, and 1.04% from two or more races. Hispanic or Latino of any race were 1.47% of the population.

There were 3,887 households, out of which 41.9% had children under the age of 18 living with them, 68.2% were married couples living together, 7.3% had a female householder with no husband present, and 21.4% were non-families. 16.9% of all households were made up of individuals, and 4.2% had someone living alone who was 65 years of age or older.  The average household size was 2.83 and the average family size was 3.21.

In the township the population was spread out, with 28.8% under the age of 18, 7.3% from 18 to 24, 34.1% from 25 to 44, 23.1% from 45 to 64, and 6.8% who were 65 years of age or older.  The median age was 35 years. For every 100 females, there were 103.1 males.  For every 100 females age 18 and over, there were 101.4 males.

The median income for a household in the township was $67,288, and the median income for a family was $76,045. Males had a median income of $56,418 versus $31,565 for females. The per capita income for the township was $27,414.  About 3.4% of families and 4.2% of the population were below the poverty line, including 3.8% of those under age 18 and 11.4% of those age 65 or over.

Local industries
Testek Inc. is located in the Quadrants Research Park. Established in 1969 by engineers, the company designs and builds custom test equipment for the aerospace, industrial and alternative energy industries. Testek is a large defense supplier to the US military.

Bielomatik, Inc. is located in the Lyon Industrial Research Park. The company designs and builds plastic welding machinery, primarily for the automotive market. Specialties include hotplate fuel tank welding, linear vibration welding and traditional hotplate welding on a variety of scales.

Pratt Miller Engineering is located in New Hudson and, in addition to an arms division that was established in 2013, is best known as the operators of the Corvette Racing motorsports team.

Education

Sections of the township attend South Lyon Community Schools. South Lyon East High School is located within Lyon Township.

A portion of the township is zoned to Northville Public Schools. Residents of that section are zoned to Thornton Creek Elementary School (Novi), Hillside Middle School (Northville), and Northville High School (Northville Township).

The William K. Smith Community Center houses the Lyon Township Public Library.

Post Office Service
The New Hudson Office, ZIP code 48165, serves an area in the north central part of the township.
 South Lyon Office, ZIP code 48178, serves much of the southern and western parts of the township.
Northville Office, ZIP code 48167, serves areas in the southeast portion of the township.
 Wixom Office, ZIP code 48393, serves areas in the northeast portion of the township.
 Milford Office, ZIP code 48381, serves a narrow band along the northern part of the township.

References

External links

Charter Township of Lyon
Testek Inc

Townships in Oakland County, Michigan
Charter townships in Michigan 
Metro Detroit
Populated places established in 1834
1834 establishments in Michigan Territory